Everardo Hegewisch (born 23 July 1961) is a Mexican equestrian. He competed in the team jumping event at the 1988 Summer Olympics.

References

External links
 

1961 births
Living people
Mexican male equestrians
Olympic equestrians of Mexico
Equestrians at the 1988 Summer Olympics
Place of birth missing (living people)